The following is a list of notable people who were born, or lived for a significant period of time, in Flint, Michigan, United States.

Movie, radio, television and theater figures
Bob Bell, original WGN Bozo the Clown
Sandra Bernhard, actress, author and comedian
Howard Bragman, public relations practitioner, television pundit, writer and lecturer
William David Brohn, Tony Award-winning music orchestrator
Tony Burton, actor, football player, and boxer, Rocky films
Kerry Conran, filmmaker, writer, director
Terry Crews, actor, host and football player
Seamus Dever, actor, Castle
Bob Eubanks, game show host, The Newlywed Game
Casey Kasem, radio DJ who started his career in Flint; host of the long running American Top 40; voice actor, most notably as Shaggy Rogers in the Scooby-Doo franchise and Robin in the Super Friends franchise 
Nancy Kovack, actress and wife of the conductor Zubin Mehta
David Magee, Oscar-nominated screenwriter for Life of Pi and Finding Neverland
Jerry Minor, comedian and actor
Michael Moore, from the nearby town of Lapeer, liberal activist and filmmaker; writer and director of  Roger & Me, Bowling For Columbine, Fahrenheit 9/11, Sicko, Capitalism: A Love Story, Fahrenheit 11/9 
Marilyn Nash, actress, co-starred with Charlie Chaplin in film Monsieur Verdoux
Wendey Stanzler, editor and director, Roger & Me, Sex and the City, Desperate Housewives
Maddie Taylor, voice actress, storyboard artist and comedian
Charles Wolcott, film music composer 
Michael Wylie, multi-award-winning Art Director in TV and Film
Erin Darke, tv & film actress

Musicians and bands
Dee Dee Bridgewater, jazz singer
Betty Carter, jazz vocalist
Chiodos, screamo/post-hardcore band on Equal Vision Records (Davison, MI)
Jon Connor, rapper
The Dayton Family, rap group
DFC, hip hop duo
Mark Farner, solo rock artist, formerly of Grand Funk Railroad
Fredwreck, record producer of Snoop Dogg, Dr. Dre, Britney Spears
Grand Funk Railroad, rock group
Mona Haydar, Syrian-American rapper, poet and songwriter 
LaKisha Jones, American Idol 2007 finalist, third runner-up
Mario Judah, rapper
Bfb Da Packman, rapper
King 810, metal band
Miko Marks, country singer
MC Breed, rapper
Me Phi Me, rapper
Geoff Moore, onetime member of Geoff Moore and the Distance, Christian rock band
PBK, noise/experimental composer
Don Preston, onetime member of Frank Zappa and the Mothers of Invention
Question Mark and the Mysterians, rock group
Ready for the World, R&B group
Repulsion, death metal/grindcore band
Rio Da Yung OG, rapper
RMC Mike, rapper
Antwaun Stanley, R&B singer and songwriter
The Swellers, punk rock band; members grew up in Fenton, Michigan, but got their start playing Flint Local 432
Terry Knight and the Pack, rock group, predecessor to Grand Funk Railroad
Top Authority, rap group
Whitey Morgan and the 78's, honky tonk and outlaw country band
Fleming Williams of The Hues Corporation; lead singer on disco hit "Rock the Boat"

Sports figures

Baseball
Jim Abbott, one-handed MLB pitcher famous for throwing a no-hitter despite his disability
Scott Aldred, MLB pitcher
Steve Boros, MLB infielder, manager and executive
Geraldine Guest, All-American Girls Professional Baseball League player
Jeff Hamilton, MLB infielder
Rick Leach, MLB outfielder
Joe Mays, MLB pitcher
Ron Pruitt, MLB outfielder and catcher
Merv Rettenmund, MLB outfielder
Mickey Weston, MLB pitcher

Basketball

Charlie Bell, one of Michigan State University's "Flintstones"
Miles Bridges, professional basketball player for the Charlotte Hornets
Demetrius Calip, player for 1989 University of Michigan championship team
Mateen Cleaves, Michigan State player, one of the "Flintstones"
JuJuan Cooley, pro player in Eastern Europe
Tonya Edwards, European and WNBA player
Marty Embry, played for DePaul University, drafted by Utah Jazz, 13-year pro career, chef, author
Desmon Farmer, professional basketball player with Ironi Ashkelon 
Terry Furlow, MSU and NBA player
Jeff Grayer, Olympic and NBA player
Cory Hightower, Flint high school star
Darryl Johnson, MSU player
Kyle Kuzma, professional basketball player for the Washington Wizards
Tamika Louis, Fresno State player
Roy Marble, former Iowa and NBA player
Thad McFadden, American-born Georgian national basketball player
JaVale McGee, former Nevada and current Phoenix Suns player
Pamela McGee, USC women's basketball star
Monté Morris, professional basketball player for the Denver Nuggets
Deanna Nolan, WNBA player
Morris Peterson, Michigan State player, one of the "Flintstones"
Glen Rice, Michigan and NBA player
Eddie Robinson, NBA player
Keith Smith, Loyola Marymount player
Barry Stevens, Iowa State player
Stacey Thomas, WNBA player
Trent Tucker, Minnesota and NBA player
Coquese Washington, WNBA player; first President of WNBA players association; current head coach of Penn State women's basketball team
James Young, NBA player, 2019-20 top scorer in the Israel Basketball Premier League

Track and field
Herb Washington, four-time All-American sprinter, world record holder, professional baseball player

Boxing
Tony Burton, also football player and actor
Chris Byrd, world champion
Tracy Byrd, world champion
Andre Dirrell, pro middleweight boxer, Olympic bronze medalist in 2004 Summer Olympics in Athens
Anthony Dirrell, pro middleweight boxer 
Claressa Shields, first back-to-back two-time Olympic gold medalist in 2012 Summer Olympics in London and 2016 Summer Olympics in Rio de Janeiro

Football
Carl Banks, linebacker, two-time Super Bowl champion
Tony Burton, also boxer and actor
Brandon Carr, cornerback for Baltimore Ravens, Dallas Cowboys
Todd Carter, kickoff specialist for Carolina Panthers
Lynn Chandnois, Pro Bowl player for Pittsburgh Steelers
Don Coleman, Michigan State player, member of College Football Hall of Fame
Terry Crews, NFL defensive end; actor
Courtney Hawkins, NFL wide receiver
Mark Ingram II, NFL running back; 2009 Heisman Trophy winner; born and raised in Grand Blanc, attended Flint Southwestern Academy
Mark Ingram Sr., NFL wide receiver
Stephen Jones, CFL player
David Kircus, pro football wide receiver
Paul Krause, NFL Hall of Famer
Todd Lyght, NFL defensive back, Notre Dame assistant coach
Thad McFadden, NFL wide receiver
Mike Miller, NFL wide receiver
Booker Moore, running back for Penn State
Jim Morrissey, NFL linebacker for Super Bowl XX champion Chicago Bears
Don Morton, head coach, North Dakota State, Wisconsin
Ricky Patton, NFL running back for Super Bowl XVI champion San Francisco 49ers
Clarence Peaks, NFL fullback
Thomas Rawls, NFL running back for Seattle Seahawks
Harold "Tubby" Raymond, member of College Football Hall of Fame; 300 wins as head coach at University of Delaware
Andre Rison, NFL wide receiver, 5-time Pro Bowl selection, Super Bowl champion
Bob Rowe, NFL lineman
Jon Runyan, 14-year NFL lineman; politician
Dan Skuta, NFL player
Fernando Smith, NFL defensive lineman
Robaire Smith, NFL defensive lineman
Barry Stokes, NFL offensive lineman
Andre Weathers, cornerback, University of Michigan and New York Giants
Brent Williams, NFL defensive end
Reggie Williams, NFL linebacker
Chris Wilson, Canadian Football League player
Lonnie Young, NFL defensive back

Hockey
Ken Morrow, defenseman, Davison, Michigan native, part of Miracle on Ice and four-time Stanley Cup champion with New York Islanders
Brian Rolston, won 1995 Stanley Cup championship with New Jersey Devils
Tim Thomas, goaltender; Davison native; former goalie for Dallas Stars and Boston Bruins; 2010 Olympics silver medalist, 2011 Stanley Cup champion and Conn Smythe award winner

Mixed martial arts
Mike Perry, UFC fighter since 2016

Tennis
MaliVai Washington, 1996 Wimbeldon finalist

Weightlifting
Lamar Gant Powerlifter, first person in history to deadlift five times his own bodyweight

Writers, journalists, and poets
David W. Blight, author and Sterling Professor at Yale University, 2019 Pulitzer Prize winner for Frederick Douglass: Prophet of Freedom
Christopher Paul Curtis, author of books for children and young adults
Jeremy Drummond, mystery, urban fiction author
William M. Gallagher, photographer, 1953 Pulitzer Prize winner for Flint Journal
Ben Hamper, writer, Rivethead: Tales from the Assembly Line
E. Lynn Harris, author
Patrick Jones, author of books for young adults, library textbooks, and resource guides
Adam Kotsko, author and professor at Shimer College
Edmund G. Love, author (Subways Are for Sleeping)
Steve Mariotti, author of several books; founder of the National Foundation for Teaching Entrepreneurship
Marcus Sakey, author and host of the Travel Channel show Hidden City
Jon Scieszka, children's author
John Sinclair, poet and activist
Theodore Weesner, novelist, best known for his coming-of-age novel The Car Thief

Others
Todd Beamer, passenger on United 93 flight who attempted to foil hijacking and reclaim aircraft on 9/11
Benjamin Bolger, student, most credentialed person in modern history
David Sheldon Boone, former U.S. Army signals analyst who was convicted of espionage-related charges in 1999
Paul L. Brady, first African American Federal Administrative Law Judge
William E. Bryan Jr., United States Air Force major general and World War II flying ace 
Henry Howland Crapo, 14th Governor of Michigan, founder of Flint and Holly Railroad
William Crapo Durant, founder of General Motors
Arthur Jerome Eddy, art collector and critic
Jerome Eddy, mayor of Flint, 1878–79; diplomat
Barry Edmonds, photographer
Thomas M. George, M.D., former Michigan State Representative and State Senator
Mary Henrietta Graham, the first African-American woman to be admitted to the University of Michigan (graduated from Flint High School in 1876)
Duane D. Hackney, most decorated airman in history of the Air Force
Sidney Redding Mason, Minnesota state legislator and businessman
Amir Mirza Hekmati, U.S. Marine who spent time in prison in Iran as falsely accused CIA spy, went to high school in Flint and Flint Township 
Dale Kildee, former member of the Michigan House of Representatives and U.S. House of Representatives
Dan Kildee, member of the U.S. House of Representatives 
Sinnamon Love, pornographic actress
Floyd J. McCree, first African American mayor of Flint, namesake of Floyd J. McCree building in downtown Flint
Samuel B. McKinney, civil rights leader, Baptist pastor
Donald R. McMonagle, decorated pilot, astronaut, NASA launch manager
Craig Menear, chairman and CEO of The Home Depot
Charles Stewart Mott, two-time mayor of Flint, businessman, philanthropist; namesake of Mott Community College, the Charles Stewart Mott Foundation, the Charles S. Mott Prize, the C.S. Mott Children's Hospital, and Mott Lake
Stewart Rawlings Mott, philanthropist
Betty Lou Reed, Illinois state representative
Donald Riegle, former U.S. Senator and Congressman
Eric Ogden, photographer 
Stephen Smale, mathematician
Tim Sneller, member of the Michigan House of Representatives
Jay Springsteen, motorcycle national champion
Andrew J. Transue, Genesee County Prosecutor, U.S. Congressman and attorney (Morissette v. United States)
Karen Weaver, psychologist, businesswoman, and first female mayor of Flint
Michael M. Wood, former U.S. Ambassador to Sweden, grew up in Flint

See also
List of mayors of Flint, Michigan

References

External links
Larry Page's University of Michigan Commencement Address

 
Flint, Michigan
Flint